Sirajuddin Ajmal is an Indian politician and was a member of parliament of the 16th Lok Sabha from Barpeta (Lok Sabha constituency), Assam. He won the 2014 Indian general election being an All India United Democratic Front candidate.

Biography
Ajmal was born on 21 February 1958 to a Bengali Muslim family from Hojai in central Assam. His family traces their origins to the Sylhet district of eastern Bengal. He is the son of Haji Ajmal Ali, a rice farmer who moved to Mumbai in 1950 to try to succeed in the perfume industry using the oud plant. After the opening of the first store in the 1960s, the Ajmal perfume brand quickly grew to become a large brand in the Middle East.

Career
He is one of the Director of Ajmal Foundation (NGO) which is actively involved in Social Welfare Activities in the state of Assam, India. The major activities of Ajmal Foundation are:

Ajmal Group of Colleges (13 Colleges)
National Talent Search Examinations
Literacy Programmes
Ajmal Computer Education Centres (25 Nos.)
Academic and Professional Coaching Programmes
Employment Generation Projects
Women Empowerment Schemes
Merit Scholarships, Medical Aids, Marriage Aids, Safe Drinking Water Schemes, Low Cost House, Appliances to differently abled persons, sanitation scheme and relief distribution.
Ajmal Foundation also has future plans of setting up Ajmal University, Ajmal Engineering College, Ajmal College of Education, Ajmal College of Pharmacy for the poor and downtrodden.

References

India MPs 2014–2019
Living people
Lok Sabha members from Assam
21st-century Indian Muslims
All India United Democratic Front politicians
People from Barpeta district
People from Barpeta
1958 births
21st-century Bengalis
20th-century Bengalis